Alias Janaki is a 2013 Indian Telugu language romantic drama film directed by Daya K and starring newcomers Rahul Venkat and Anisha Ambrose. The film released theatrically and online on 26 July 2013.

Cast 
Rahul Venkat as Janaki Ram
Anisha Ambrose as Chaitra
Sri Ramya as Priyadarshini
Naga Babu as Janaki Ram's father
Tanikella Bharani as Janaki Ram's superior officer
Sivannarayana Naripeddi
Shatru as Mysa

Production 
The film began production starring Rahul Venkat (Chiranjeevi's cousin) and Nisha Aggarwal. Aggarwal was later replaced with debutante Anisha Ambrose.

Soundtrack 
Music by newcomer Shravan. Karthik Pasupulate of The Times of India gave the film a rating of thee out of five stars and said that "Debutante music director Shravan has packed in a refreshing new vibe in the album".

"Maarindhe" sung by Haricharan
"Koncham Koncham" sung by Shravan and Kavya
"Aranyamantha" sung by Balaram Iyyer
"Santhalo Perigina Sundari" sung by Shravan Bhargavi
"Kaatuka Kannula" sung by Sai Charan
"Kaadhal Prema" sung by Shravan

Release and reception 
The film was initially scheduled to release on 19 July. A critic from The Times of India opined that "It’s a little too loaded and preachy, besides some shallow intensity and noble intentions it has nothing much to offer". A critic from 123telugu stated that "Neelima Thirumalasetty’s intentions are worth applauding, but she needs to take better care about the execution of her future projects". Deepa Garimella of Full Hyderabad wrote that "Alias Janaki does deserve a watch for its intent".

Awards 
Nandi Awards
Best Film on National Integration
Best Director – Daya Kodavaganti

References 

2010s Telugu-language films
2013 films